The crow honeyeater (Gymnomyza aubryana) is a very large honeyeater endemic to humid forests in New Caledonia in the South Pacific.

The species measures . It has orange facial wattles. It superficially resembles a crow with its glossy black plumage and a curved beak. Crow honeyeaters have long rounded wings and a long tail and neck. Their bill is long and bicolored – yellow below, black above. It has a loud, ringing call, which is predominantly heard in the early mornings.

It is relatively inconspicuous, and lives either in pairs or alone. It forages for invertebrates and nectar in the canopy and midstory.

This bird is critically endangered due to introduced rats. Extensive surveys have only found it in the Parc de la Rivière Bleue area, on the slopes of the Kouakoué, in the Pourina and Ouiné valleys, at Rivière Blanche and on the slopes of Mont Pouédihi and Mt Panie. It is spread throughout the island, though mostly in the south. It is estimated that there are between 50 and 249 birds left.

References

External links 
 BirdLife Species Factsheet

crow honeyeater
Endemic birds of New Caledonia
Critically endangered fauna of Oceania
crow honeyeater
Taxa named by Jules Verreaux
Taxa named by Marc Athanase Parfait Œillet des Murs